The Assistant is a 1982 Czechoslovakian drama film directed by Zoro Zahon. The film was selected as the Czechoslovakian entry for the Best Foreign Language Film at the 55th Academy Awards, but was not accepted as a nominee.

Cast
 Gábor Koncz as Valent Lancaric
 Elo Romančík as Riecan
 Ildikó Pécsi as Mrs. Riecan
 Marta Sládecková as Eva Riecanová
 Ivan Mistrík as Dobrik
 Milan Kis as Filadelfi
 József Ropog as Torok
 Hana Talpová as Vilma
 Július Satinský as Dr. Bielik

See also
 List of submissions to the 55th Academy Awards for Best Foreign Language Film
 List of Czechoslovak submissions for the Academy Award for Best Foreign Language Film

References

External links
 

1982 films
1982 drama films
Slovak drama films
Slovak-language films